Mionatrix is an extinct genus of Colubrid snake that lived during the Miocene. Fossils have been found in Linqu, Shandong province, People's Republic of China. The type species is M. diatomus, the fossils of which are preserved in the Paleozoological Museum of China.

References

Mionatrix diatomus at fossilworks
Mionatrix diatomus at Paleozoological museum of China official website (Chinese)

Colubrids
Miocene reptiles
Fossils of China